Fortini Ground is the home ground of Maltese football club Vittoriosa Stars F.C, which plays in the Maltese Premier League. Fortini Ground is located in the small town of Birgu, Malta, and has a capacity of 1,000 spectators.

Football venues in Malta
Vittoriosa Stars F.C.
Buildings and structures in Birgu